Khawaja Muhammad Safdar Medical College (formerly, Sialkot Medical College) is a public sector Medical College in Sialkot, Pakistan. It was established on the initiative of CM Shehbaz Sharif to give quality education in the region of Punjab and especially in Sialkot. It was named after Khawaja Muhammad Safdar in 2017, who took an active part in the Pakistan Movement before 1947 and was the father of current political leader of Pakistan Muslim League (N), Khawaja Muhammad Asif. It was established in 2008 with a sanction of PKR 450 million. Affiliated Hospitals include Allama Iqbal Memorial Hospital, Sialkot (400 Beds) and Sardar Begum Memorial Hospital, Sialkot (240) beds. The College is recognised by the Pakistan Medical and Dental Council (PMDC). and is listed by the Foundation for Advancement of International Medical Education and Research (FAIMER). The students and alumni of KMSMC are commonly referred to as Kmsians.

Principals
The first Principal was Professor Dr. Tanvir Ali Khan Sheerwani; the second Principal was Professor Dr. Malik Shah Zaman Latif; the third Principal was Professor Dr Nosheen Omer. The fourth Principal was Professor Dr Zafar Ali Choudry. The fifth and most recent principal is Professor Dr. Tariq Mehmood Rehan''

Academic programs
Bachelor of Medicine and Bachelor of Surgery (MBBS) - a 5-year undergraduate programme
Bsc Nursing
Paramedical School

Departments

Basic science departments
Anatomy
Biochemistry
Community medicine
Forensic medicine
Pathology
Pharmacology 
Physiology

Medicine and allied departments
Cardiology
Dermatology
Endocrinology & Metabolism
General medicine
Neurology
Pediatrics
Preventive medicine
Psychiatry
Pulmonology (Chest medicine)
Radiotherapy
Urology

Surgery and allied departments
Anesthesiology
Cardiac surgery
Cosmetic surgery
General surgery
Neurosurgery
Obstetrics and gynaecology
Ophthalmology
Oral and maxillofacial surgery
Orthopedics
Otorhinolaryngology
Pediatric surgery
Radiology

Administrative departments
IT Department

References

External links
Official website

Medical colleges in Punjab, Pakistan
Universities and colleges in Sialkot